In February 1813 Captain David Porter sailed the  around Cape Horn and cruised the Pacific, warring on British whalers. Over the next year, Porter captured 12 whalers and 360 prisoners. On 28 March 1814 Porter was forced to surrender to Captain James Hillyar after an engagement that became known as the Battle of Valparaiso. He had to surrender to the frigate  and the sloop-of-war  when Essex became too disabled to offer any resistance. Of the 12 ships Porter captured, only one returned to the United States; seven returned to British control, three were destroyed, and the Chilean government seized one.

References

Porter, David Dixon (1875) Memoir of Commodore David Porter: Of the United States Navy. (J.Munsell)
Porter, David (1815) Journal of a cruise made to the Pacific ocean in the United States frigate Essex: in the years 1812, 1813, and 1814, Volumes 1-2. (Bradford and Inskeep).

Whaling ships
Age of Sail merchant ships of England
Lists of captured ships